The Nanosystems Initiative Munich (NIM) is a German research cluster in the field of nano sciences. It is one of the excellence clusters being funded within the German Excellence Initiative of the Deutsche Forschungsgemeinschaft.

The cluster joins the scientific work of about 60 research groups in the Munich region and combines several disciplines: physics, biophysics, physical chemistry, biochemistry, pharmacology, biology, electrical engineering and medical science. Using the expertise in all these fields the cluster aims to create new nanosystems for information technology as well as for life sciences.

The participating institutions of the Nanosystems Initiative Munich are the Ludwig Maximilians University, the Technical University of Munich, the University of Augsburg, the Max Planck Institutes of Quantum Optics and Biochemistry, the Munich University of Applied Sciences, the Walther Meissner Institute and the "Center for New Technologies" at Deutsches Museum.

References

External links
 Nanosystems Initiative Munich
 NIM on the LMU Excellent website of Ludwig Maximilians University of Munich 
  https://www.dfg.de/forschungsfoerderung/koordinierte_programme/exzellenzinitiative/exzellenzcluster/liste/exc_detail_4.html
  http://idw-online.de/pages/de/news179797

Ludwig Maximilian University of Munich
Munich University of Applied Sciences
Nanotechnology institutions
Research institutes in Munich
University of Augsburg